Stephanie Wheeler  (born in Norlina, North Carolina on January 16, 1981) is an American wheelchair basketball player who was on two gold medal-winning Paralympic teams. She also played on the gold medal-winning team at the 2007 Para-Pan-American Games in Rio de Janeiro. She received her degree in kinesiology from the University of Illinois and is working on her doctorate in sports education from the University of Alabama. As of 2010 she is head coach of the University of Illinois wheelchair basketball team, and will return to the Paralympic games in Rio in 2016, now as a coach.

Introduction to Wheelchair Basketball 
At age 6, Stephanie became paralyzed after being in a car accident that took her mother's life. As a child, she was an active participant in T-ball and gymnastics, and she wanted to remain active despite her paralysis. At age 12, she joined her local adaptive sports club that only offered one sport: wheelchair basketball.

Several years later, she attended a sports camp at the University of Illinois, where she was able to compete in wheelchair basketball on a larger scale than her hometown of 1000 people in Norlina, North Carolina. Spending time at the university exposed her to what she could achieve if she worked hard and received good grades. As a result, she applied and eventually became a student athlete at the University of Illinois. During her time as a student athlete, she won three national championships in wheelchair basketball. In 2004, she graduated with a degree in kinesiology.

After undergraduate school, she relocated to the University of Alabama, where she received her master's degree in adaptive sport and pedagogy. While she was a student there, she helped grow their new wheelchair basketball program.

Team USA 
Many of Stephanie's teammates at the University of Illinois were members of Team USA, and they encouraged her to apply. She did not make the team after her first tryout, but eventually was accepted to the development team in 2001. From there, she competed in the Paralympic games in Athens (2004) and Beijing (2008), winning gold medals at both. The team's gold medal in 2004 was the first gold medal Team USA had won at the Paralympic games in 22 years. While she was on Team USA, they also won 2 World Championship silver medals and 1 gold medal.

Coaching 
Stephanie retired from wheelchair basketball as a player in 2010 but wanted to continue her involvement in the sport. The position of head coach at the University of Illinois opened up at the same time as her retirement, so she applied for and received the job. The success of her program at the university led to her being named head coach of Team USA.

Personal life 
Throughout her adolescence, Stephanie had dated men, but she began dating women in 2008. Shortly after, she came out as gay to her teammates.

References 

American women's wheelchair basketball players
Wheelchair basketball players at the 2004 Summer Paralympics
Wheelchair basketball players at the 2008 Summer Paralympics
Paralympic wheelchair basketball players of the United States
Paralympic gold medalists for the United States
Wheelchair category Paralympic competitors
University of Illinois alumni
1981 births
Living people
Medalists at the 2004 Summer Paralympics
Medalists at the 2008 Summer Paralympics
American sportswomen
American women's basketball coaches
People from Warren County, North Carolina
Paralympic medalists in wheelchair basketball
People with paraplegia
21st-century American women